The 2015 Georgetown Hoyas football team represented Georgetown University in the 2015 NCAA Division I FCS football season. They were led by second-year head coach Rob Sgarlata and played their home games at Multi-Sport Field. They were a member of the Patriot League. They finished the season 4–7, 2–4 in Patriot League play to finish in fifth place.

Schedule

References

Georgetown
Georgetown Hoyas football seasons
Georgetown Hoyas football